The Winter of Our Discontent is an album by The Echoing Green, originally released on April 14, 2003, on A Different Drum. The album was released to Europe with a slightly different track listing in 2004 through Infacted Recordings, and through BEC Recordings on December 14, 2004, with another slightly different track listing.

Track listing
 "Daybreak" (Joey Belville) – 1:26
 "The Story of Our Lives" (Belville) – 5:30
 "Fall Awake" (Belville) – 5:56
 "Apology" (Belville, Chrissy Jeter) – 4:37
 "Bittersweet" (Trey Many) – 5:36
 "Starling" (Jeter, Belville) – 5:07
 "Blind" (Belville) – 4:13
 "Someday" (Belville, Jeter) – 5:06
 "Heidi's Song" (Belville) – 3:54
 "New Gold Dream (81, 82, 83, 84)" (Kerr, Burchill, McNeil, Forbes) – 4:37
 "Winter" (Belville, Jeter) – 5:07

Track listing (Infacted Recordings version) 
 "Daybreak" – 1:26
 "The Story of Our Lives" – 5:30
 "Fall Awake" – 5:56
 "Apology" – 4:37
 "Bittersweet" – 5:36
 "Starling" – 5:07
 "Blind" – 4:13
 "Someday" – 5:06
 "Heidi's Song" – 3:54
 "Seaside" (Belville, Jeter) – 3:05
 "The Story of Our Lives" (Syrian Remix) – 5:08
 "The Story of Our Lives" (Echo Image Remix) – 5:10

Track listing (BEC Recordings version) 
 "Daybreak" – 1:26
 "The Story of Our Lives" – 5:30
 "Fall Awake" – 5:56
 "Apology" – 4:37
 "Bittersweet" – 5:36
 "Seaside" – 3:05
 "Starling" – 5:07
 "Blind" – 4:13
 "Someday" – 5:06
 "Epiphany" (George Robison, Belville) – 4:12
 "The Sparrows and the Nightingales" (Reinhardt, Heppner) – 3:55
 "Winter" – 5:07
 "The Story of Our Lives" (Echo Image Remix) – 5:10

Credits 
 Joey Belville – programming, vocals
 Chrissy Jeter – vocals
 Dave Adams – drums on "Seaside"
 Fox Fletcher – guitar on "Seaside"
 Jenna London – soprano vocals on "The Story of Our Lives"
 Jason Smith – additional piano on "Someday"
 Rusty Wiseman – guitar on "New Gold Dream (81, 82, 83, 84)"

2003 albums
The Echoing Green albums